Down to Earth was a light-hearted BBC One television drama series first broadcast in 2000 about a couple who start a new life on a Devon farm. The early episodes of the series were based on a series of books written by Faith Addis about their real-life move from London to Devon.

The music in the series was composed by Sheridan Tongue and Tony Hadley, and had the song "After All this Time" as its opening and closing credits in series 2 and 3.

Plot
The first series starred Pauline Quirke as Faith Addis, a teacher, and Warren Clarke as her long-suffering husband Brian, as they encountered various misfortunes and difficulties in adjusting to their new rural lifestyle, which is not helped by their uncooperative children's attitude to moving to a new location. The series was generally light in tone, although took a tragic turn following Brian's death in a road accident in series three.

In 2003 the Addis family leave the farm for good. They are replaced by the Brewer family. Matt Brewer (Ian Kelsey) is Brian's cousin. He leaves the big city with his young new wife Frankie (Angela Griffin) and his three children from his first marriage to move to Devon to take over the farm.

Two years later the Brewer family moved back to the city and were replaced by Jackie (Denise Welch), Tony Murphy (Ricky Tomlinson), and their wayward daughter Emma (Zara Dawson), who owned the local pub. The 5th and final series was broadcast from 2 January 2005 to 6 March 2005.

Cast
 Pauline Quirke – Faith Addis
 Warren Clarke – Brian Addis
 Toby Ross-Bryant – Marcus Addis
 Ellie Beaven – Sarah Addis
 Alexandra Stone – Molly Addis
 Katy Reeves – Celeste Addis
 Pat Keen – Addy Addis (mother-in-law)
 Ian Kelsey – Matt Brewer
 Angela Griffin – Frankie Brewer
 Ram John Holder – Wilson Steadman
 Elizabeth Bennett – Daphne Brewer
 Inga Brooksby – Becky Brewer
 Charlotte Redpath – Lucy Brewer
 Finn Atkins – Kate Cooper 
 Thomas Byrne – Sam Brewer
 Denise Welch – Jackie Murphy
 Zara Dawson – Emma Murphy
 Liam Hess – Jake Smith
 Shelley Conn – Kerry Jamil
 Ricky Tomlinson -Tony Murphy
 Jason West – Adam / Mose
 Sally Watts – Laura Carter
 Robert James-Collier – Nick Christy
 Marc Ryan-Jordan – Ryan Cooper

Episodes

Series 1 (2000)

Series 2 (2001)

Series 3 (2003)

Series 4 (2004)

Series 5 (2005)

Ratings

DVD release
Down to Earth: Series One was released on DVD via Acorn Media on 1 June 2009. No further series have not been made available.

See also
 Forever Green (ITV series with very similar theme)

References

External links
 
Down To Earth Homepage
Down to Earth at the Internet Movie Database

2000s British drama television series
2000 British television series debuts
2005 British television series endings
BBC television dramas
Television shows set in Devon
English-language television shows